The Cabinet of Liberia, together with the President and Vice President, form the executive branch of government in the country. The President, with the consent of the Senate, appoints cabinet ministers.

The current government 
The following is a list of ministers currently serving in the administration of President George Weah, who took office as president on 22 January 2018:

See also
Liberian elections, 2005
List of government ministries of Liberia

References

Government of Liberia
Liberia